This is a list of universities in Algeria, there are an estimated 130 universities and colleges under the authority of the Ministry of Higher Education and Scientific Research in Algeria.  The following are among the universities in Algerias:

List of universities

See also 
 Education in Algeria
 Ministry of Higher Education and Scientific Research in Algeria
 List of universities in Africa

References

External links 
 Algeria universities directory
 List of Algerian universities

Universities
Algeria
Algeria